The Paranormal Journey:Into the Unknown is an American paranormal television series that will premiere as a new original series in the United States on Amazon Oct 31st, 2017. The promos has taken the media by storm. The series features Gavin Kelly and Paula Purcell as they investigate the most haunted abandoned asylums, sanitariums and mental hospitals. The show airs on Saturday's at 8/7c. They have been heard across the United States on numerous AM / FM Radio Stations 

The series follows the paranormal team known as the Phantasmic Ghost Hunters setting out to shake up the Paranormal realm or community with their investigative processes and scientific experimentation at numerous haunted locations across the nation. Country Music Star Turned Ghost Hunter.

Premise
The series features a team of 2 Paranormal Investigators out to get a better understanding and the true meaning of Life after Death. Communicating with the other side with documented proof whether it

be Video Footage, Photographs and EVPS. We are determined to seek out Hauntings in the most Haunted locations in the United States, to debunk their claims, bring forth documented data to prove whether or not the dwelling is actually Haunted. There are

many un-documented stories out there which we want to be the 1st to uncover the truth.

Opening introduction:

Cast
Phantasmic Ghost Hunters:
Gavin Kelly - PGH Founder
Paula Purcell - PGH Historian

Series Overview

Episodes

Season 1 (2017)

See also
Apparitional experience
Parapsychology
Ghost hunting
Paranormal television
Haunted locations in the United States

References

External links
Official website 

Paranormal television